Name Torre Europa refer to:

 Torres Europa (Torre Europa 1 to 5), complex of skyscrapers in L'Hospitalet de Llobregat, suburb of Barcelona
 Torre Europa (Madrid), skyscraper in Madrid